Acontias schmitzi is a species of lizard in the family Scincidae. It is endemic to Zambia.

References

Endemic fauna of Zambia
Acontias
Reptiles described in 2012
Taxa named by Philipp Wagner
Taxa named by Donald George Broadley
Taxa named by Aaron M. Bauer